This is a list of the recipients of the Bangla Academy Literary Award from 1970 to 1979.

1970 
 Ataur Rahman (poetry)
 Satyen Sen (novel)
 Hasan Azizul Huq (short story)
 Anisuzzaman (essay-research)
Ibrahim Khalil (drama)
Atowar Rahman (juvenile literature)
 Abul Kalam Shamsuddin (translation)

1971 
 Hasan Hafizur Rahman (poetry)
 Zahir Raihan (novel)
 Jyoti Prakash Dutta (short story)
 Mufazzal Haider Chaudhury (essay-research)
 Anwar Pasha (essay-research)
 Ekhlasuddin Ahmed (juvenile literature)

1972 
 Abdul Ghani Hazari (poetry)
 Mohammad Moniruzzaman (poetry)
 Rashid Karim (novel)
Shahid Saber (short story)
Badruddin Umar (essay-research)
Kalyan Mitra (drama)

1973 
 Fazal Shahabuddin (poetry)
 Shahid Qadri (poetry)
 Rabeya Khatun (novel)
 Rahat Khan (short story)
 Syed Murtaza Ali (essay-research)
Bulbul Osman (juvenile literature)
 Kabir Chowdhury (translation)

1974 
 Sufi Motahar Hossein (poetry)
 Razia Khan (novel)
Sayeed Atiqullah (short story)
Abdul Haque (essay-research)
  (essay-research)
Sazedul Karim (juvenile literature)

1975 
 Abul Hasan (poetry)
Shams Rashid (novel)
Minnat Ali (short story)
Ali Ahmed (essay-research)
 Sayeed Ahmed (drama)
 Abdullah-Al-Muti (juvenile literature)
 Abdus Sattar (translation)

1976 
Matiul Islam (poetry)
 Dilara Hashem (novel)
Sucharit Chowdhury (short story)
Sirajuddin Kasimpuri (essay-research)
 Momtazuddin Ahmed (drama)
 Foyez Ahmad (juvenile literature)
 Sardar Fazlul Karim (translation)

1977 
Abdur Rashid Khan (poetry)
Mohammad Mahfuzullah (poetry)
 Mahmudul Haque (novel)
 Mirza Abdul Hai (short story)
 Hasnat Abdul Hye (short story)
 Momtazur Rahman Tarafdar (essay-research)
 Zia Haider (drama)
 Sukumar Barua (juvenile literature)
 Abdul Hafiz (translation)

1978 
K. M. Shamser Ali (poetry)
Imaul Haque (poetry)
Razia Mazid (novel)
 Rizia Rahman (novel)
Nazmul Alam (short story)
Shahid Akhand (short story)
 Serajul Islam Choudhury (essay-research)
 Abdullah al Mamun (drama)
 Kazi Abul Kasem (juvenile literature)
 Moniruddin Yusuf (translation)
Abdur Rashid (translation)

1979 
 Zillur Rahman Siddiqui (poetry)
 Abu Zafar Obaidullah (poetry)
 Abdus Shakur (short story)
Zahrul Haque (essay-research)
 Ahmed Rafiq (essay-research)
 Shamsul Haque (juvenile literature)
Abu Shahriar (translation)

References

Bengali literary awards
Bangladeshi literary awards
Lists of award winners
Civil awards and decorations of Bangladesh